Paramount Vantage (formerly known as Paramount Classics) was a film production label of Paramount Pictures (which, in turn, has Paramount Global as its parent company), charged with producing, purchasing, distributing and marketing films, generally those with a more "art house" feel than films made and distributed by its parent company. Previously, Paramount Vantage operated as the specialty film division of Paramount Pictures, owned by Viacom.

History 
Paramount Classics was launched on May 15, 1998 and released such art house fare as The Virgin Suicides, You Can Count on Me, Sunshine, Mostly Martha, Winter Solstice, and three Patrice Leconte films (Girl on the Bridge, The Man on the Train, Intimate Strangers). Although film journalist David Poland felt "Ruth Vitale and David Dinerstein have proven to have wonderful taste heading up Paramount Classics",  the duo was fired in October 2005.

In 2006, the Paramount Vantage brand branched off from Paramount Classics, which was relaunched in 2007 as a distributor of "smaller, review-driven films including foreign-language acquisitions and documentaries."

In 2007, Paramount Vantage partnered with then-Disney subsidiary Miramax on two of the year's most highly regarded movies, No Country for Old Men and There Will Be Blood. Both films garnered eight nominations at the Academy Awards, with There Will Be Blood winning the awards for Best Cinematography and Best Actor for Daniel Day-Lewis, while No Country for Old Men won for Best Adapted Screenplay, Best Director, Best Supporting Actor for Javier Bardem, and Best Picture.

Despite its critical success, Paramount Vantage continually failed to deliver the financial returns Paramount Pictures expected. Only No Country for Old Men made a profit, while films that many believe should have generated significant returns failed to deliver through either poor or excessive marketing.

In June 2008, Paramount Pictures consolidated Paramount Vantage's marketing, distribution, and physical production departments into the parent studio, while retaining the Paramount Vantage brand to develop and acquire specialty product with dedicated creative staff.

Paramount Vantage in 2014 closed down after the release of Nebraska.

Paramount Classics releases

Paramount Vantage releases

See also 
 Paramount Pictures
 Go Fish Pictures
 Miramax Films

References 

Companies established in 1998
Companies disestablished in 2014
Film production companies of the United States
Paramount Pictures
Hollywood, Los Angeles